Line 2 of the Nanning Metro a rapid transit line running from north to south Nanning. It opened on the 28 December 2017. The eastern extension opened on 23 November 2020.

Opening timeline

stations

References

02
Railway lines opened in 2017
2017 establishments in China